Ross Fleming Butler (born May 17, 1990) is an American actor. He is best known for his role as Zach Dempsey in the Netflix series 13 Reasons Why and as Brett Willis on K.C. Undercover.

Early life
Butler was born in Singapore to a Chinese-Malaysian mother and an English-Dutch father. He lived in Jakarta, Indonesia before moving to the United States when he was four and was raised by his mother in Fairfax, Virginia, a suburb outside Washington, D.C.

He studied chemical and biomolecular engineering at Ohio State University. He dropped out after a year and later moved back to Virginia, where he took courses at a community college. He then moved to Los Angeles at the age of 20.

Career 
Butler took his first acting class at age 21. He got his start with roles in student films and low budget projects. He landed his breakthrough recurring role on the Disney Channel series K.C. Undercover. He had roles in the Disney Channel films Teen Beach 2 and Perfect High.

In 2017, he was cast as Reggie Mantle in Riverdale. He was later cast as Zach Dempsey in 13 Reasons Why, and left Riverdale due to his commitment to 13 Reasons Why. He would reprise Mantle in Riverdale'''s 100th episode "The Jughead Paradox" in a scene alongside his successor Charles Melton's portrayal.

In 2019, he played Adult Eugene Choi in the superhero film Shazam!. He also played Trevor, Peter Kavinsky's best friend, in To All the Boys: P.S. I Still Love You, released in 2020 by Netflix.

In 2020, it was announced that Butler would star alongside Kiernan Shipka in the Quibi series Swimming with Sharks. The project remained unreleased after the demise of Quibi's platform, but was released by Roku in the spring of 2022.

Butler has roles in two upcoming film adaptions: Claudia Tan's Perfect Addiction alongside Kiana Madeira and Matthew Notzka and Abigail Hing Wen's Loveboat, Taipei opposite Ashley Liao.

Filmography

Film

Television

Music video

 References 

 Further reading 
 Early interview with Teen.com
 Interview with Salon
 Interview with Flaunt Interview with Bello Magazine Interview with Glass Magazine Interview with Euphoria Magazine''

External links 
 
 

1990 births
Living people
People from McLean, Virginia
American male television actors
American male film actors
American male voice actors
Male actors from Los Angeles
Ohio State University College of Engineering alumni
21st-century American male actors
Male actors from Virginia
Singaporean emigrants to the United States
Singaporean people of Dutch descent